Tej Kenar (also Romanized as Tej Kenār and Tajkenār; also known as Tachkinār and Tajkinār) is a village in Ahlamerestaq-e Shomali Rural District, in the Central District of Mahmudabad County, Mazandaran Province, Iran. At the 2006 census, its population was 333, in 85 families.

References 

Populated places in Mahmudabad County